Patinoire Polesud or Pôle Sud (English: "South Pole Ice Rink") is a 4,208-seat multi-purpose arena in Grenoble, France. It is the home of the ice hockey club of the city, the Brûleurs de Loups (English: "Wolfs Burners"), one of the bests in France.

Features
It is used for ice hockey, figure skating, and short track. There is a jumbotron and seating for 4,208 spectators around the competition rink, making it the largest arena in the Ligue Magnus.

In addition to skating related events, the Patinoire Polesud also features a 2-megawatt sound system and lighting, as well as a screen for retransmission of sporting events, movies, and concerts. Over two million spectators have come to see events since the arena opened in 2001.

Events
French Figure Skating Championships in December 2001
Final of the Coupe de France 2003-2004 ice hockey in March 2004
French Short Track Speed Skating Championships in April 2004
2017 Internationaux de France in Novembre 2017
2018 Internationaux de France in Novembre 2018
2019 Internationaux de France in Novembre 2019

References

External links
 Official Site

Indoor arenas in France
Sports venues in Isère
Buildings and structures in Grenoble